Crymlyn Burrows is an area of land in Wales, UK to the east of Swansea city centre, and south of Crymlyn Bog.  It is bounded by Jersey Marine Beach to the south and the River Neath to the east.  The land west of Baldwin's Crescent falls within the City and County of Swansea and from Baldwin's Crescent eastwards falls within Neath Port Talbot.

The area northwest of the Fabian Way contains a small settlement at Elba Crescent and Baldwins Crescent and areas of industry and commerce.  The 1940s Swansea Bay Museum is located in Elba Crescent.  The museum contains exhibits showing what life was like in the Swansea Bay area during and just after World War II.

Nature reserve

The undeveloped salt marsh area south of the Fabian Way and north Jersey Marine Beach is a designated biological Site of Special Scientific Interest and is one of the last remaining places of the Swansea Bay coastline that has remained unmodified by industrial development.  The area contains sand dunes, a salt marsh and carr woodland.  The burrows also contain a rare orchid - the Fen Orchid, Liparis loeselii. The  site was acquired by St. Modwen from BP in November 2009 and will be kept as a protected leisure destination.

Industry and commerce

Industrial sites in the northeastern part of the area include the Linamar Elba Works site, the Gower Chemicals site, and Network Rail's Swansea Burrows yard.

Part of the Visteon industrial site was acquired by RT Properties in 2007 with Visteon consolidating their operations in the Elba Works plant.  The part of the site which was sold includes factory premises and the offices and Canteen buildings fronting the Fabian Way.  The plant was originally built in 1959 for the Prestcold fridge company and was later acquired by Ford who manufactured car axle and transmission components there.  Ford later transferred the site to Visteon.  The  site acquired by RT properties has been re-developed as a business park branded Swansea Gate Business Park.  The  car parts factory was later closed and is now used as a film studio.

BP has a storage site south east of the Fabian Way adjacent to Swansea Docks. Amazon.co.uk has a  distribution centre just west of the Jersey Marine roundabout on the Fabian Way.

Leisure

The 18 hole links golf course of the Swansea Bay Golf Club lies to the east of Jersey Marine village.  It is the oldest golf club in the Swansea area.  The marina of the Monkstone Sailing and Cruising Club is located at Earlswood in the east of the area, under the M4 Motorway viaduct, with access to the estuary of the River Neath.

Fabian Way
Fabian Way is an arterial road which connects Swansea city centre with the M4 Motorway at junction 42. It forms a stretch of the A483 road. Fabian Way is a dual carriageway for its whole length. The road is a standard national speed limit dual carriageway between Jersey Marine and the junction with the M4. It is considered to be the main entrance to Swansea City Centre.

Plans
A new residential development was approved in 2009 for the area north of Elba Crescent, consisting of 33 houses with a planned total of 100 and a new business area.

Swansea University
Swansea University has built a  site close the Fabian Way as a second campus and innovation park.  The development is on land previously used by BP as a petrochemicals transit site which BP gifted to the university.  The site stretches from Swansea Docks to Crymlyn Bog.  Funding for the project was made available in September 2012 from the Welsh Government and the European Investment Bank.  Construction work started on the site in 2013 and the main phase completed in 2015, with accommodation blocks still being added.  Companies which intend to establish research facilities at the site include Rolls-Royce, Hewlett-Packard, Tata, Bell Labs and BAE.

Nearest places
Swansea Docks
Port Tennant
Crymlyn Bog
Jersey Marine
Baglan Bay

References

External links
Photographs from Geograph
Historical photographs of Burrows Yard
Swansea Docks - Crymlyn Burrows

Nature reserves in Swansea
Salt marshes of Neath Port Talbot
Salt marshes of Swansea
Sites of Special Scientific Interest in West Glamorgan
Swansea Bay